The Ligier JS39 was a Formula One car used by the Ligier team during the 1993 and 1994 Formula One seasons.

Ligier JS39 
The engine was the Renault RS5 3.5 V10.

The number 25 chassis was driven by experienced Briton Martin Brundle and the number 26 driven by Mark Blundell. The team did not employ a test driver. The main sponsor was French tobacco company Gitanes. 
The team used a semi-automatic gearbox for the first time, but retained passive suspension. 
The car was relatively successful for the team, achieving 3 podium finishes, and 23 constructor points.

Ligier JS39B

For , the car was upgraded to 'B' specification. The number 26 seat was occupied by Olivier Panis for the whole year, however, the number 25 seat was taken by Éric Bernard, Johnny Herbert and Franck Lagorce. The team's test driver was Lagorce. The engine was a Renault RS6 3.5 V10. The team's main sponsor was again Gitanes. The car did not perform as well as in 1993 but was reliable, enabling Panis and Bernard to finish 2nd and 3rd respectively in the German Grand Prix. The team scored only two other points finishes for the rest of the season.

The JS39B was also tested by Michael Schumacher at Estoril in early 1994, at the request of Flavio Briatore, who became the owner of the Ligier team, after the team was purchased by Tom Walkinshaw and Briatore in 1994.

Complete Formula One results
(key) (results in bold indicate pole position; results in italics indicate fastest lap)

References
Technical specifications

1993 Formula One season cars
1994 Formula One season cars
Ligier Formula One cars